The year 2007 is the 6th year in the history of the Universal Reality Combat Championship, a mixed martial arts promotion based in the Philippines. In 2007 the URCC held 3 events beginning with, URCC 10: X.

Events list

URCC 10: X

URCC 10: X was an event held on June 30, 2007 at The Fort in Taguig, Metro Manila, Philippines.

Results

URCC Cebu 1

URCC Cebu 1 was an event held on September 1, 2007 at Royal Concourse Hall in Cebu, Philippines.

Results

URCC 11: Redemption

URCC 11: Redemption was an event held on November 25, 2007 at One Esplanade in Pasay, Metro Manila, Philippines.

Results

See also
 Universal Reality Combat Championship

References

Universal Reality Combat Championship events
2007 in mixed martial arts